Aintourine ( known also as Ain Tourine, `Aynturin, `Intawrin,  or Amtourine,) is a village located in the Zgharta District in the North Governorate of Lebanon. It is situated in the valley of Qozhaya, the northern branch of the Valley of Qadisha.

The population is 85% Shia Muslim and 15% Maronite Christian.

References

External links
 Ehden Family Tree

Zgharta District
Populated places in the North Governorate
Maronite Christian communities in Lebanon